The 2006 Budweiser UK Open was the fourth year of the UK Open darts tournament organised by the Professional Darts Corporation. It was held at the Reebok Stadium, Bolton, between 9–11 June 2006.

Phil Taylor was the defending champion but got knocked out at the quarter-final stage by Raymond van Barneveld. Van Barneveld went on to win the title, winning 13–7 against Barrie Bates in the final.

Format
Qualifying events were held at Greene King pubs across the UK – winners from each pub event progressed to one of four Regional Finals, to be staged in their relevant area. Players who reach the final eight in the Regional Finals will qualify for the televised stages of the UK Open in Bolton.

In addition there were eight UK Open Regional Finals for the "professional" players. All events were open to all darts players on payment of an entry fee – which means that players from both the PDC and BDO were eligible to enter. Players who enter through the Greene King Qualifying Round were not eligible to play in the regional qualifying events and vice versa.

The results of the eight qualifiers were then collated into an Order of Merit table (Winner £4000; Runner-up £2000; 3–4 £1000; 5–8 £500; 9–16 £250; 17–32 £100; 33–64 £50). The top 96 players plus ties in this Order of Merit join the 32 Greene King qualifiers at the televised stages in Bolton.

1st round
Players who were ranked between 65 and 96 in the UK Open Order of Merit join the 32 Greene King qualifiers in the first round of the UK Open.

2nd round
Players ranked 33 to 64 join the first round winners.

3rd round
Players ranked in the top 32 join the second round winners.

2005/2006 UK Open Regional Finals
25 September 2005 (Welsh) Mark Walsh 2–1 Phil Taylor  
23 October 2005 (Irish) Colin Lloyd 2–1 Andy Smith  
6 November 2005 (Scottish) Adrian Lewis 2–0 Colin Lloyd  
8 January 2006 (North East) Kevin Painter 2–0 Colin Lloyd  
12 February 2006 (South West) Mark Dudbridge 2–0 Dennis Priestly  
5 March 2006 (Southern) Chris Mason 2–1 Barrie Bates  
19 March 2006 (North West) Alan Tabern 2–1 Steve Maish  
9 April 2006 (Midlands) Raymond van Barneveld 2–0 Ronnie Baxter

UK Open Qualifiers

Top 32 in UK Open Order of Merit (receiving byes into third round)

Numbers 33–64 of UK Open of Merit (receiving byes into second round)

Remaining numbers of UK Open of Merit (starting in first and preliminary round)

Greene King Qualifiers

Friday 9 June

Preliminary round, best of 11 legs

1st Round, best of 11 legs

2nd Round, best of 15 legs

Saturday 10 June

3rd Round, best of 15 legs

4th Round, best of 21 legs

Sunday 11 June

Last 16 to Final

Random draws were made after each round up to the quarter final stage. Draw bracket has been compiled retrospectively.

References

External links
 Darts Database 2006 UK Open Results

UK Open
UK Open Darts
UK Open
UK Open